5,N,N-trimethyltryptamine (5,N,N-TMT; 5-TMT) is a tryptamine derivative that is a psychedelic drug. It was first made in 1958 by E. H. Young. In animal experiments it was found to be in between DMT and 5-MeO-DMT in potency which would suggest an active dosage for humans in the 20–60 mg range. Human psychoactivity for this compound has been claimed in reports on websites such as Erowid but has not been independently confirmed.

Legal Status

United States
5,N,N-TMT is not scheduled at the federal level in the United States, but it could be considered an analog of 5-MeO-DMT, in which case, sales or possession intended for human consumption could be prosecuted under the Federal Analog Act.

See also
 2,N,N-TMT
 7,N,N-TMT
 5-Chloro-DMT
 5-Ethyl-DMT

References 

Psychedelic tryptamines
Dimethylamino compounds